Khinalug, Khynalyg, or Khinalyg (Khinalug: Kətş; also rendered as Khanaluka, Khanalyk, Khinalykh, or Khynalyk), is an ancient Caucasian village going back to the Caucasian Albanian period. It is located high up in the mountains of Quba District, Azerbaijan. It is also a municipality in Quba District, which consists of the villages of Khinalug and Galaykhudat.

Location
It is located just south-west of Quba in the middle of the Greater Caucasus mountains that divide Russia and the South Caucasus. Khinalug is also the highest, most remote and isolated village in Azerbaijan and among the highest in the Caucasus. The weather changes dramatically during summer and winter, ranging from −20 °C to 18 °C. Khinalug has a population of about 2,000 people. This small group of people speaks the Khinalug language, which is an isolate within the Northeast Caucasian language family, although many speak Azerbaijani as well.

History
On 7 October 2006, the President of Azerbaijan, Ilham Aliyev, announced plans to modernise the educational buildings, infrastructure, governmental buildings and other resources of Khinalug.

In 2007 Aliyev established Khinalug State historical-architectural and ethnographic reserve by presidential decree, to preserve the unique appearance, language and customs of the village.

Khinalug was included on the World Monuments Fund's 2008 Watch List of the 100 Most Endangered Sites due to concern over the building of a road between Khinalug and Guba. The listing is not intended to criticise potential tourist and commercial activity in Khinalug, rather it is intended as a warning that new development should not come at the cost of the site's essential, historic character.

The Ministry of Culture and Tourism restored the roofs of nearly a hundred homes in Khinaluq in 2011, and the 9th-century mosque was restored in 2012–2014.

Architecture

Tikmes and tekulduz are two of the most ancient types of Azerbaijani embroidery. The master craftsmen of this profession embroider various ornamental designs on to white linen using multicolored threads. Tikmes can only be made by hand, and is considered as the most important decoration to be embroidered on clothes. Since ancient times, linens have been decorated with multicoloured threads, both in the West and the East. There are different forms of this craftsmanship in Azerbaijan. Its earliest examples are referred to in the period of Sasanian Empire (4th century). Columns supporting roofs are seen in the centre of local houses. They have no furniture. However, there are plenty of pillows, blankets, and mutakkah (long oblong shaped pillows), as well as large and small sized mattresses. They don't have tables and by custom, the inhabitants sit on the floor.

Culture and customs

The inhabitants of Khinaliq have preserved their traditional way of life. Weddings and other ceremonies are held in strict conformity with the rites inherited from one generation to another. This area abounds with the richest traditions linked to rain and land cultivation coupled with a special attitude to domestic animals, weddings and funerals, as well as to celestial bodies. The rites and traditions that have become an integral part of life are linked closely to natural phenomenon. The villagers are mainly involved with sheep breeding. A different weaving technique is well known here. Shawls woven with wool in Khinaliq are famous throughout the entire region of Guba. Neighboring villagers used to buy this raw material to make outer clothes. In the past, chukha, a shawl made of wool, was a national costume worn by the richer people in the villages. Wool socks which look like a mini carpet of many colours are widely worn because it is impossible to imagine Khinaliq residents in winter. One of the main activities also carried out by the local people is the collection and preparation of curing herbs. They are collected and dried for subsequent use in food making and sold to tourists.

August marks the beginning of the honey season in Khinaliq. Local honey differs by its unforgettable taste and odor. The local people say that honey is a remedy for curing seventy diseases. In autumn, they celebrate the season of goat's meat which also differs due to its special taste.

To be fair, it is rare to find such an ecologically pure fuel. Whilst in Khinaliq, one may often notice a pile of cubes or bricks called tezek in Azerbaijani made of manure. In the past, this type of bio-fuel was widely used in Azerbaijan. The manure is piled up and mixed with hay, formed into special shapes and then pressed. The bricks formed are dried in the sun and then, used to build high walls. The bricks are the main fuel used by the inhabitants of Khynalyg: they are high-quality material and do not incur any additional costs.

Ethnic background
The people of Khynalyg are related to the Northeast Caucasian ethnic group. They are mostly brown-haired, with brown or blue eyes, not very tall, and rather corpulent.

They were certainly among the 26 tribes living in Caucasian Albania that Greek philosopher Strabo mentioned in Geography.

Eight ancient graveyards surround the village, covering an area several times greater than that of the village. Most graves conceal three or four burial layers. The tombstones' inscriptions are written in various alphabets. In order to defend themselves in the 10th century against various nomadic tribes, special defense facilities, including a fortress, were built in Khynalyg: the main watchtower also included the Zoroastrian Temple. Local elders relate that the priest who lived in this Temple was called "Piajomard" and that he used to watch an eternal flame burning there.

Language

The Khinalug people speak a distinct language that is an isolate within the Northeast Caucasian languages; it may be more closely related to the Lezgic languages than to other Northeast Caucasian groups, but that relationship has not been shown. The first description of the Khinalug language is provided in the writings of R.F. von Erkert. In his book, 'Languages of Caucasian Origins', published in German in Vienna in 1895, he describes the grammar and phraseology of the Khinalug language. In order to learn the Khinalug language, a special branch of the Institute of Linguistics of the USSR was established in the village in the 20th century. The linguists who worked there compiled the entire alphabet of this Latin script language, which contains seventy-two letters. The people of Khinalug call their village Ketsh, themselves Kettid, and their language Ketshmits’. The name 'Khinalug' started to be used in the 1950s and 1960s. It derives either from the colour of the henna of the surrounding rocks or the name of a Hun tribe. The hair-style, which in the past was popular amongst Hun and Turkic warriors, remains fashionable. One can never see the same in any other place in Azerbaijan. Similar styles are today only retained in Siberia and Mongolia, although they may also be seen in history films. These films show young boys with heads fully shaven except for a long braided single tress that hangs from the top. Young boys used to live with this tress until their adolescence, when they were obliged to cut it off when they were drafted into the Army.

Religion
The village's population follows Shafi'i Sunni Islam. Khynalyg's inhabitants are very religious and prior to accepting Islam, had been followers of Zoroastrianism. Currently, there are almost ten mosques in the village. In the 12th century, Abu Muslim had started to preach about Islam in the region, and thus, the Juma Mosque built at that time is named after him. This holy place, located on the hill in the centre of the village, is considered to be the precursor of all local mosques. Two rocks, two meters high, on the right-hand side of the entrance to this Mosque have runic inscriptions. A plaque situated on the wall on another mosque called Pirjomard shows the date of its construction - in 1388 AD.

In the oldest part of the village with Zoroastrian traces is situated is the Burj sanctuary, which was built in the 7th century, and is only attended during Muslim religious celebrations.

Khynalyg is surrounded by caves, pirs ('a holy place' or a 'shrine' in Azerbaijani), temples and ateshgahs (Zoroastrian praying places' in Azerbaijani). Pirs can be seen everywhere. Each of them has a grave where a holy person - the yevliya - is interred. Almost every pir has a scene, depicted on its wall, of Ibrahim bringing his son Ismail for sacrifice. The most famous pir of this village is called Khydyr Nabi. Each pir is considered as the remedy for turning away the Evil Eye. For instance, the Pir Khydyr Nabi is visited by those who have sore teeth: it is also known as the Pir of toothache. People say that if you take one of the small, round-shaped stones found in this Pir, then your toothache will be ended.

Another well-known pir is called 40 Abbal. This was the place of prayer for forty dervishes (a dervish is a wandering holy person in Azerbaijani). It is located in a cave which is two kilometers away from the village, and where a spring comes out of the ground. This spring is also considered as holy. A pipeline supplies water from the spring to the villagers' houses and the central square. During the most important events and celebrations, all the Khynalyg inhabitants gather in this square.

This actually is 'a burning' mountain, situated at 2600 meters above sea level and five kilometers away from Khynalyg. This mountainous territory is rich with natural gas deposits. According to the local inhabitants, there are more such places in the outskirts of Khynalyg. Well polished rocks engulfed in flames, as well as pebbles scattered all over, create an impression of a fallen tower. Those who come here not to pray, but to have a picnic, like cooking kebabs right on these stones, and then, to sunbathe under the sun's rays, whilst looking at the beauty of the highlands. A horse ride from Khynalyg to Ateshgah takes thirty minutes, whereas on foot it can take up to two or three hours. The legend about Ateshgah relates that a shepherd, who came here on a freezing day with his flock, had collected a lot of wood with which to make a bonfire. However, as he made it, the entire area was suddenly ablaze: the terrified shepherd kissed the stones and started to pray to the Almighty. Since that time, the flame has never gone out, and the place is considered as holy, and subsequently became a Temple. Indeed, it may be understood from these places why Azerbaijan is known as "the Land of Fire". Both water and earth burn with fire throughout the region.

Mount Tufandag located opposite Khynalyg, is considered to be holy. As a rule, its summit is covered by mists, and winds are always blowing. According to one of the legends, the ruins of the former ancient village destroyed a thousand years ago by an earthquake are located on the mountain. Certainly, the inhabitants of this village founded the current Khynalyg. According to the Khynalyg people, this mountain also has on it a place called Pira-Mykhykh, which is sacred for the villagers.

It is the name of one of the mountain chains of the Minor Caucasus, situated in the north of the country. In Azerbaijan, there are seven mountains whose heights exceed 4000 meters, and all of them are in the north – the region of Guba and Gusar. One of the summits of Mount Tufandag is 4062.8 meters above sea level and is named after Chingiz Mustafayev, the journalist killed on the frontline and a National Hero of Azerbaijan. Tourists who wish to climb this mountain can enjoy touristic tours.

To learn about the history of Khynalyg and its ancient artifacts, one may visit the local Museum of Khynalyg History and Ethnography, which was established in 2001. In two sections of the Museum, which has a total area of 160 m2 one can see traditional earthenware, clothes, carpets, household tools, coins, and weapons, as well as photographs of famous representatives of the village.

Atashgah fire temple 

Atashgah (atash-kadeh), a Zoroastrian fire temple with a natural flame, located ~5 km far from the village, at an altitude of ~ 3000 m above sea level, on the spur of the mountain Shahdag, at the foot of the Gizil-gaya rock. The temple was restored on the site of the former ruins by the efforts of the World Zoroastrian Organization and the Ministry of Culture and Tourism of Azerbaijan in 2016. It was listed in the “List of state-protected historical and cultural monuments of the Republic of Azerbaijan”, ID #4647.

The existence of Zoroastrian religious buildings in this part of the Caucasus is repeatedly mentioned by various authors.

Adam Olearius, a German traveler of the 17th century:

“…During which time they also drive their Cattel towards the Mountain of Elbours, where they find not only a more temperate air, but also as good Meadow-ground as any in all Persia. That Mountain is part of Mount Caucasus, and it is of such height, that though it be at a very great distance from thence, in as much as it lies on one side of Tabristan, towards Georgia, yet may it be discovered from Kale Kuhestan, and the other neighbouring Mountains of Scamachie. It was upon this Mountain of Elbours, as it is reported, that the Persians kept and antiently Worshiped their perpetual Fire: but now there is not the least track to be seen of it, neither there, nor near Jesche, though Texeira, and those who follow him, would have us believe the contrary. True indeed it is, that there are, to this day, in the Indies, certain Religious men, who have a Veneration for the Fire, and keep it in with the same care that the Persians did here to fore...”

As it follows from the description and the map, Olearius called Mount Shahdag as Elburs.

Armenian clergyman Makar Barkhudariants in 1893 provides information about the ancient fire temple of Khinalig:

 “... a baghin (temple) was built in a Kuba district near the village of Khinalik near a volcano called Ateshgah, where various buildings were constructed  on the ancient remains by newcomers from India.”

Legend about Snowman
The village of Khynalyg is known, not only for its ancient traditions but also because the villagers have seen a snowman''. In 1988 a young hunter, called Babaali Babaaliyev, and still alive today, was hiding in one of the caves near Khynalyg: he was hunting the wild goats, which wandered into the caves to lick the rock salt. Whilst he was taking a nap, the hunter was awakened by someone who blocked the cave entrance with his body. Babaali said that a large and hairy human-like being had stared at him in absolute silence. Terrified, he did not dare to move. His hands became numb, and he could not even make the single step necessary to reach his nearby rifle. Still looking at him, the being decided to leave. Since this occurrence, Babaali has long been in shock, has never recovered and has always avoided the place where the appalling encounter took place.

Gallery

References

External links

Xinaliq language and culture website
The official Xinaliq website
Xinaliq.com Tourism website
Xinaliq Tourism information 
The World Monuments Fund 2008 Watch Listing for Khinalug

 
Populated places in Quba District (Azerbaijan)